The Anti-Imperialist National Democratic Front (AINDF) is a banned popular front organization in South Korea.

The AINDF is guided by Juche, the official state ideology of North Korea, and aims to carry out a popular revolution in South Korea, achieve independence by removing the United States Forces Korea, and hasten the reunification of the country. The AINDF is identical in organization to the Democratic Front for the Reunification of Korea, the de jure popular front of North Korea, and has missions in the North Korean capital of Pyongyang (the only ostensibly South Korean organization to) and another in Japan.

The AINDF is banned in South Korea under the National Security Law as a spy group for the Workers' Party of Korea, the ruling party of North Korea, but operates clandestinely within the country and is regarded as a legitimate organization by North Korea.

History 
The Anti-Imperialist National Democratic Front was officially founded on 25 August 1969 by Kim Jong-tae, who published a magazine named Chongmaek, and Choi Yong-do as the Revolutionary Party for Reunification, with a history dating back to the 1964 formation of a preparatory committee. The group was established during the period of the Third Republic of Korea, an anti-communist military dictatorship under President Park Chung-hee, and both founders were executed along with other leaders of the organization; other members were sentenced to long prison terms. Kim Jong-tae's wife and two children were never seen again.

On 27 July 1985, it renamed itself to the National Democratic Front of South Korea, and renamed its propaganda broadcasting station (that had a main station in Haeju) from "Revolutionary Party for Reunification" to "Voice of National Salvation". It adopted its current name on 23 March 2005.

Notes

References

Citations

Sources

Books

Journal articles

News articles

External links 
  
 English website

1969 establishments in South Korea
Banned political parties in South Korea
Banned communist parties
Anti-imperialism in Korea
Korean nationalist parties
Far-left politics in South Korea
North Korea–South Korea relations
Political parties established in 1969
Popular fronts
Socialist parties in South Korea
Juche political parties